Aslandere is a village in the Fındıklı District, Rize Province, in Black Sea Region of Turkey. Its population is 264 (2021).

History 
According to list of villages in Laz language book (2009), name of the village is Çikuleti. Most villagers are ethnically Laz or Hemshin.

Geography
The village has a road which passes from Gürcüdüzü plateau.

References

Villages in Fındıklı District
Laz settlements in Turkey